This article deals with the grammar of the Udmurt language.

Pronouns
Udmurt pronouns are inflected much in the same way that their referent nouns are. However, personal pronouns are only inflected in the grammatical cases and cannot be inflected in the locative cases.

Personal pronouns
Somewhat like in English, Udmurt personal pronouns are used to refer to human beings only. However, the third person singular can be referred to it. Udmurt personal pronouns only inflect in the grammatical cases and the allative case. The nominative case of personal pronouns are listed in the following table:

Reflexive pronouns
Udmurt reflexive pronouns only inflect in the grammatical cases and the allative case. The nominative case of reflexive pronouns are listed in the following table:

Interrogative pronouns
Udmurt interrogative pronouns inflect in all cases. However, the inanimate interrogative pronouns 'what' in the locative cases have the base form -. The nominative case of interrogative pronouns are listed in the following table:

The following table shows Udmurt interrogative pronouns in all the cases :

*The allative case is commonly called "approximative" when talking about Udmurt and Komi.

Noun forms
Udmurt does not distinguish gender in nouns or even in personal pronouns: '' = 'he' or 'she' depending on the referent.

Cases
Udmurt has fifteen noun cases: eight grammatical cases and seven locative cases. Notice that the word in a given locative case modifies the verb, not a noun. The locative cases can only be used with inanimate references with the exception of the allative case. Alternative forms containing  can only used after the plural suffix (i.e. the illative singular , but plural ). The less common accusative suffix  is used after the plural suffix, in addition to more common .

*The allative case is commonly called "approximative" when talking about Udmurt and Komi.

Udmurt case endings affix directly to nouns quite regularly with the exception of a few lexemes of Uralic origin. These lexemes have stem changes when declining in the locative cases whose endings begin with a vowel:

The personal pronouns, however, have irregularities in comparison to the declension of other nouns:

Plural

There are two types of nominal plurals in Udmurt. One is the plural for nouns - (after vowels)/- (after consonants)/- (after certain consonants to avoid palatalization) and the other is the plural for adjectives -/-.

Nominal plural
The noun is always in plural. In attributive plural phrases, the adjective is not required to be in the plural:

The plural marker always comes before other endings (i.e. cases and possessive suffixes) in the morphological structure of plural nominal.

Predicative plural
As in Hungarian, if the subject is plural, the adjective is always plural when it functions as the sentence's predicative:

Following numerals
Nouns are ordinarily in the singular when following cardinal numbers. However, a living being as the sentence's subject may be in the plural. In this case, the predicate verb must be in congruency with the subject.

Possessive suffixes

Nominal possessive suffixes
Udmurt possessive suffixes are added to the end of nouns either before or after a case ending. The possessive suffixes vary in the nominative and accusative cases and with case endings. The consonant of the second and third person plural depends on if the last phoneme of the word is voiced or unvoiced.

Certain lexemes of Finno-Ugric origin (especially those ending with a vowel or meaning an inalienable object) contain the vowel -- in the first, second and third person singular nominative possessive suffixes:

Accusative possessive suffixes
Accusative possessive suffixes are shown in the following table. The consonant of the second and third person singular and plural depends on if the last phoneme of the word is voiced or unvoiced.

Possessive suffixes with case endings, singular
The morphological placement of possessive suffixes with other endings depends on the case. Possessive suffixes are the same as nominative suffixes after which the genitive, ablative, dative, abessive, adverbial and allative cases agglutinates.

An , an old Uralic first person singular marker, appears in the first person singular. The  does not appear in the inessive, illative, terminative and prolative cases where the case ends with a vowel.

Possessive suffixes with case endings, plural
As in the singular, possessive suffixes precede the genitive, ablative, dative, abessive, adverbial and allative cases. However, the vowel of the singular persons reduce to :

As in the singular, possessive suffixes follow the instrumental, inessive, illative, elative, egressive, terminative and prolative cases. The suffix forms follow the same structure as in the singular.

Some words can be used as nouns, adjectives, and adverbs without a change in form. For example,    means "cleanliness", "clean", and "clearly".

The third person singular possessive suffix also acts as a definite article:   ("the Udmurt language is nice" – literally "Udmurt language's nice").

Adjectives
There is no congruency between adjectives and nouns in neutral Udmurt noun phrases, i.e. there is no adjective declension as in the inessive noun phrase , 'in a large/big village' (cf. Finnish inessive phrase  'in a large/big village', in which  'big/large' is inflected according to the head noun). However, as stated earlier, Udmurt adjectives in neutral attributive (non-predicative) noun phrases may have a plural marker when the noun is pluralised.

Determinative
Udmurt does have an emphasising determinative suffix. Its function is to place emphasis on the features of the referent, defining and separating it from a group of other similar referents. The determinative adjective conjugates as in the third person singular or plural and the noun conjugates without any other marker.

Comparative
Comparative is used when two referents are compared to each other but the subject of comparison does not necessarily need to be expressed.

The subject of comparison can be expressed either in the ablative case or with the postposition  structure. If the subject of comparison it is shown the comparative suffix can be left out.

Superlative
There is no superlative suffix in Udmurt.

Postpositions
Udmurt makes use of postpositions rather than prepositions. A large percentage of the stems of Udmurt postpositions have a locative meaning and can conjugate in the local cases. For example,  means 'top' and also 'surface' and can inflect in all the locative cases: (inessive) , (elative) , (illative) , (prolative) , (egressive) , (terminative)  and (allative) .

However less than the seven locative cases are included in paradigm inflection of many of the postpositions. The paradigm usually consists of the inessive, elative and illative cases.

Some common postpositions are:

The illative form of the postposition  'side' is  'to the side of'.

There is also a small group of non-inflecting postpositions in addition to those inflecting in the locative cases (cf. Finnish  "with (a person)" that always takes the genitive case:  "with a friend"). A few examples of these are:

Most of the nouns in Udmurt postposition phrases are inflected in the nominative but there are a few postpositions that require the noun to be in the dative, ablative or instrumental cases:

Verbs
Udmurt verbs are divided into two groups or two conjugations, both having the infinitive marker .

There are three verbal moods in Udmurt: indicative, conditional and imperative. There is also an optative mood used in certain dialects. The indicative mood has four tenses: present, future, and two past tenses. In addition there are four past tense structures which include auxiliary verbs. Verbs are negated by use of an auxiliary negative verb that conjugates with personal endings. Separate personal pronouns are not required in verb phrases.

The basic verbal personal markers in Udmurt are (with some exceptions):

Present tense

The third person singular main verb is either marked by the full stem (conjugation I) or unmarked (conjugation II).

The negative verb conjugates with the ending  in first and third person singular and third person plural.

Future tense

The negative indicative future is formed by the auxiliary  negative verb and the stem of the main verb in singular persons.

The negative verb conjugates with the ending  in first person singular. Third person singular and third person plural have the ending  and the remaining are as in present negative.

Past tense
The conventionally used designations preterite and perfect are used with denotations which are divergent from their usual meanings in the grammar of other languages.

Preterite I
The first preterite can be compared with the simple past in English.

The negative preterite I is formed by the auxiliary  negative verb and the stem of the main verb in singular persons.

The negative verb conjugates with the ending  in first person singular. Third person singular and third person plural have the ending  and the remaining are as in present negative.

Preterite II
The second preterite is a past tense with an evidentiality distinction. It can be compared to the English perfect in which the speaker did not personally observe the past event.

In addition to the normal personal endings, the present indicative marker  is featured in first persons and a frequentive verbal marker  is present in the second and third person plural. There is no personal ending in the third person singular and sometimes featured in the third person plural.

The negative preterite II is formed either by including the auxiliary copular negative verb  'is not' or with the negation marker .

Auxiliary past tenses
There are four past tenses in Udmurt which use a preterite form of the main verb and a preterite form of the auxiliary verb 'to be'.

Pluperfect I
The Udmurt pluperfect makes use of the preterite I main verb and the auxiliary , 'was' in third person singular, also in simple past. The pluperfect I tense expresses a process of action that has happened in the (distant) past.

The negative Pluperfect I is formed by the negative preterite I negative plus the auxiliary .

Pluperfect II
There are two structures of the pluperfect II tense. One uses the preterite II third person singular form of the main verb inflected with a personal possessive suffix and the auxiliary . The other is the preterite II of the main verb (with normal personal inflection) and the preterite I form of the 'to' be verb . The pluperfect II tense expresses the result of an action that has been completed, but no one had seen.

Durative preterite
The durative preterite in Udmurt can be compared to the past progressive in English "was doing". Its function can be described as expressing a process in the past. The structure is the present tense of the main verb with either preterite of the auxiliary verb. The structure of the negative durative preterite is the negative present tense of the main verb with either preterite of the auxiliary verb.

Frequentative preterite
The frequentative preterite in Udmurt expresses a repeated action in the past. The structure is the future tense of the main verb with either preterite of the auxiliary verb. The structure of the negative frequentative preterite is the negative future tense of the main verb with either preterite of the auxiliary verb.

Passive voice
Udmurt does not have a separate affix to express a passive voice. The plural third person of the verb is used as a personal form to express an unknown, non-determinative actor.

Moods

Conditional
The conditional mood expresses an unrealistic action which the speaker considers to be supposed, possible or hopeful. The third person singular, however, can function without a personal ending. The first person singular preterite I negative verb  is used in the negative conditional.

Imperative
The stem of the verb is used for the second person singular imperative in Udmurt. If the stem of a conjugation I verb ends in one consonant or is one syllable and ends in a vowel, the short stem is the imperative. If the stem of a conjugation I verb ends in two consonants, the full stem is used.

Optative
An optative mood is used in certain dialects.

Modals
Udmurt makes use of the morphosyntactic structure of inflected nominals and verbs with an auxiliary for modal expressions.

To express ability, the verb , 'to be' is inflected in the third person singular (in all tenses) with the subject in the genitive case. The verb to which the subject directs ability is inflected with the past participle  (preterite II, third person singular) with a personal possessive suffix.

Desiderative
The desiderative modal expresses desire. The verb , 'to want' is inflected in the third person singular (in all tenses) with the subject in the genitive case. The verb to which the subject directs the desire is inflected with the past participle  (preterite II, third person singular) with a personal possessive suffix.

Necessive
To express necessity, the word , 'necessary' is used with the copula verb inflected in the third person singular (in all tenses) with the subject in the dative case. The infinitive of the verb to which the subject directs necessity or an object is used.

Permissive
To express permissiveness, the verb , 'to suit/to be valid' is inflected in the third person singular (in all tenses) with the subject in the dative case. The infinitive of the verb to which the subject directs permissiveness is used.

Participles
Udmurt verbs have past, present and future participles. Participles can be used in different ways than ordinary adjectives. In addition to affirmative participles, Udmurt also has caritive participles.

Present
It is a participle which expresses continuous action. It is affixed to short stems in conjugation I verbs. The present participle caritive is 

In addition to functioning as regular attributive participles, the present participle also functions as a nominalising derivational suffix.

Past
It is an attributive participle which expresses completed action. It is affixed to short stems in conjugation I verbs.

The past participle can also be inflected with the inessive ending . This is a predicative participle which expresses completed action.

Future
It is affixed to short stems in conjugation I verbs.

There is also a modal participle similar to gerunds in function. It expresses the ability to do some action or that it is possible to do the action.

Gerunds
There are four  gerunds in Udmurt, one being a caritive. that are affixed to the verb's full stem. One gerund, which also has a caritive, is formed by the past participle  (preterite II, third person singular) with the instrumental or elative case.

The "basic"  gerund (and its caritive ) can be compared to the English present active participle -ing and Finnish second or third infinitives, however having more functions. They can express a way of doing something, a reason for the action or a certain condition.

The temporal  gerund ( in southern dialects) expresses action or state of being which happens simultaneously with the action of the main verb of the clause.

The gerund also expresses the structure "instead of". In addition, possessive suffixes can be affixed after the  gerund.

The past participle gerund is inflected with either the instrumental  (caritive ) or elative  (caritive ) case, both having the basic same meaning of "because". In literary Udmurt, the gerund in the instrumental case is preferred. However, the gerund in the elative case is used with some verbs such as  'to cease/stop'.

Personal possessive suffixes can also be affixed to  gerunds:

Interrogative suffix
If there are no interrogative (question) words (who, what, when etc.), an interrogative phrase is formed by the suffix . The interrogative suffix is affixed to the constituent to which the question is concerned. The suffix's placement can also vary according to dialect. Both southern and northern dialect forms are used in literary Udmurt.

Word formation
There are a few main derivational suffixes in Udmurt word formation.

Nouns
Udmurt has the productive deverbalising nominal suffix .  is affixed to the short stem of conjugation I verbs and  affixes directly to the stem of conjugation II verbs The function of this suffix is quite diverse. With this deverbalising affix, the nominal usually:

1. expresses the action (deverbalised noun) set out by the base verb:

2. expresses the result of action:

3. expresses an instrument or tool denoted by an action:

4. expresses the focus of action:

Most of these derivations have both abstract and concrete meanings. The derivation can expresses both the action set out by the base verb or result or instrument:

Deverbalised nominal derivations can function as qualifiers of collocations, such as  'reader, digest' or  'drinking water'.

Adjectives
Udmurt has the denominalising adjectival suffixes  and carritive . The adjectives formed by the suffix  express the condition of a quality, feature or phenomenon of the base word or possession of the referent. The adjectives formed by the suffix  express the lack of quality, feature, phenomenon or referent. This suffix can be compared to the prefix un- or suffix -less in English.

Adjectives formed by the  suffix can also have a qualifier:

Udmurt also has moderative adjectival suffixes (and ) which express a somewhat large, but not complete, amount of quality of an adjective base, usually a colour or flavour.  They can be compared to the English suffix -ish. The suffix  does not normally associate with flavour, but Southern dialect variant  does.

Verbs
In Udmurt grammar, the lexical aspect (aktionsart) of verbs is called verbal aspect. Udmurt verbs can be divided into two categories: momentane verbs and frequentative verbs. The transitivity or of a verb mainly relies on if the verb is frequentative or not.

In Udmurt word formation, verbs can be derived by frequentative or causative deverbalising suffixes.

Momentane

The momentane aspect of Udmurt verbs expresses action (state of being or process) that happens only once. There is no transparent base momentane marker (cf. Finnish momentane verbs). For example,  'to read (once)'. However a causative  denotes momentanity and those verbs can be derived into frequentative verbs.

Frequentative

The frequentative aspect expresses that the action (state of being or process) does not happen just one time. The action is continuous or frequent. The frequentative aspect, however, does not denote continuous repetitiveness as in e.g.some Finnish frequentative derivations.

Some verbal derivations, that follow the pattern  → , have parallel frequentative derivations, and  can be affixed to an already frequentative derivation:

 'to rise' →  'to rise (often)'

 'to rise' →  →  'to rise (often)'

For example, the verb  ('to read') requires an object and the verb  does not.

Syntax
Udmurt is an SOV language.

Nominal sentence

The copular verb (– "to be") is omitted if the sentence is in the present tense:   ("What day is it today?"). If the sentence expresses possession, the  can be part of the predicate:   ("At you (plur.), are there forests?")

Existential sentences
These are sentences which introduce a new subject – they often begin with 'there is' or 'there are' in English.

Possessive sentences
As in most Uralic languages, ownership in Udmurt is expressed by inflection and sentence structure, rather than with a separate verb 'have'. The owner of the object and the possessed object are both inflected with a possessive suffix and used with the copula verb to express ownership.

Sources

Udmurt language
Permic languages
Uralic grammars